Bangladesh co-hosted with India and Sri Lanka the 2011 Cricket World Cup from February to April 2011 during the 2010–11 Bangladeshi cricket season, also featuring a limited overs international series between Bangladesh and New Zealand. Rajshahi Division won the National Cricket League championship title in the third consecutive season. The One Day League was contested a final time and won by Dhaka Division.

Honours
 National Cricket League – Rajshahi Division
 One-Day League – Dhaka Division
 Most runs – Nasiruddin Faruque (Barisal) 632 @ 52.66
 Most wickets – Sohag Gazi (Barisal) 41 @ 23.26

International cricket

New Zealand played five limited overs internationals, but no Tests, in October 2010, Bangladesh winning the series 4–0 after the second match was abandoned. This was the first time of Bangladesh winning an international series against a full-strength Test-playing nation (barring the West Indies series plagued by strikes).

Bangladesh co-hosted with India and Sri Lanka the 2011 Cricket World Cup from February to April 2011. Bangladesh did not fare well and failed in qualifying for quarter-finals stage.

See also
 History of cricket in Bangladesh

Further reading
 Wisden Cricketers' Almanack 2011

External sources
 Miscellaneous articles re Bangladesh cricket
 CricInfo re Bangladesh
 CricketArchive re tournaments in Bangladesh in 2010–11

2010 in Bangladeshi cricket
2011 in Bangladeshi cricket
Bangladeshi cricket seasons from 2000–01
Domestic cricket competitions in 2010–11